Frederic Walter Virtue (5 December 1896 – 4 October 1985) was a British boxer who competed in the 1920 Summer Olympics. He was born in Bermondsey and died in Southwark. In 1920, he was eliminated in the first round of the flyweight class after losing his fight to Ted Zegwaard.

References

External links
 

1896 births
1985 deaths
Boxers from Greater London
English male boxers
Flyweight boxers
Olympic boxers of Great Britain
Boxers at the 1920 Summer Olympics